Kyoto is the sixth studio album by American rapper Tyga. It was released on February 16, 2018 by Last Kings Records and Empire Distribution. The album features guest appearances from 24hrs, Gucci Mane, Kyndall and Tory Lanez. The album marks a departure from Tyga's conventional hip hop style for a heartfelt R&B style.

Background
Tyga announced the album's release date and cover art on January 22, 2018 via his Twitter account. Tyga has teased that the album will be a departure from his rapping style and will be more of a singing focused  album and personal than his previous works:

Singles
The first single "Boss Up" was released on October 4, 2017. The second single "Temperature" was released on December 22, 2017.

Critical reception 

The album received negative reviews from music critics. Scott Glaysher of HipHopDX said that "Kyoto proves that Tyga should stick to rapping" and that "His fearlessness is commended but on the scale of experiment albums, Kyoto is much closer in quality to Lil Wayne’s forgettable Rebirth album than to Kanye’s striking 808s & Heartbreak". Cracks writer Chris Kelly criticized Tyga's vocal performance and his songwriting reviewing the album, saying that "For all his talk of “singing”, Tyga sometimes struggles to sustain the melodies, sounding unsure himself about whether or not this was a good idea. Never particularly skilled as a lyricist, here he provides plenty of cringe-worthy moments". Torii MacAdams of Pitchfork said that the album is a "quasi-introspective R&B album" and "suffers from an almost total lack of imagination".

Track listing
Credits adapted from BMI.

Charts

References

Tyga albums
2018 albums
Empire Distribution albums
Concept albums